A Thousand Bones is a book written by P. J. Parrish and published by Pocket Books (owned by Simon & Schuster) on 1 January 2007, which later went on to win the Anthony Award for Best Paperback Original in 2008.

References 

Anthony Award-winning works
American mystery novels
American thriller novels
American crime novels